Ahmad Shahir bin Zawawi (born 5 September 1988), better known by his stage name Shahir, is a Malaysian singer and actor, who rose to fame after winning the eighth season of Akademi Fantasia.

Biography

Early life

Shahir's father, Zawawi Abdullah, is a teacher by profession, while his mother, Mahanum Othman, is a full-time housewife. He is the oldest out of five children.

Shahir studied at Sekolah Kebangsaan Kampar, Kampar, Perak from Year 1 until Year 6 and then at Sekolah Menengah Kebangsaan Agama Slim River, Slim River, Perak from Form 1 until Form 5. Prior to his audition for Akademi Fantasia, he was an engineering student at Centre for Foundation Studies, International Islamic University Malaysia. He is also a former member of the nasyid group, Saujana.

He currently lives in Kuala Lumpur, Malaysia.

Akademi Fantasia 2010

Shahir competed against twelve other contestants in the running to win the 8th season of Akademi Fantasia.

Shahir was eliminated after receiving the fewest votes in Week 7. In the Week 8 concert, AFMASUK was introduced and during the Debaran Concert, he was voted back in after receiving the highest number of votes. At the end of the final concert, he was crowned the winner of the Season 8, beating 4 other students. He was the first contestant to be crowned champion after being eliminated and then voted back in via AFMASUK.

Song performances on Akademi Fantasia, Season 8

Singles
 Kebahagiaan Dalam Perpisahan
 Tiba ft. Faizal Tahir & Faizal Ismail
 Dimanakan Ku Cari Ganti (tribute for P. Ramlee) ft. Stacy, Aizat, Ning Baizura, KRU, Atilia, Ella etc.
 Luar Biasa
 Pendam
 Cerita Kita
 Dia Yang Kau Pilih
 Cintakan Kembali
 Aku Yang Berdosa

Filmography

Film

Television

Programmes Hosted

Awards and nominations

Concerts and tours

References

External links
 Shahir's and Shahir FC's Official Website
 Shahir at AF Talents Official Website

1988 births
Living people
21st-century Malaysian male singers
Malaysian people of Malay descent
Malaysian television personalities
People from Perak
Singing talent show winners
Malay-language singers
International Islamic University Malaysia alumni
Akademi Fantasia winners